Vranov may refer to places:

Czech Republic
Vranov (Benešov District), a municipality and village in the Central Bohemian Region
Vranov (Brno-Country District), a municipality and village in the South Moravian Region
Vranov (Tachov District), a municipality and village in the Plzeň Region
Vranov, a village and part of Ctětín in the Pardubice Region
Vranov, a village and part of Dražíč in the South Bohemian Region
Vranov, a village and part of Mimoň in the Liberec Region
Vranov, a village and part of Mnichov (Domažlice District) in the Plzeň Region
Vránov, a village and part of Staňkov (Domažlice District) in the Plzeň Region
Vranov, a village and part of Votice in the Central Bohemian Region
Vranov nad Dyjí, a market town in the South Moravian Region

Slovakia
Vranov nad Topľou, a municipality and village